The Magic Lotus Lantern is a Chinese fairy tale from the Tang dynasty (618–907).

Story
Sanshengmu was an immortal who had fallen in love with a mortal man. Her brother, Erlang Shen, was against it but she stole a magical lotus lantern and escaped the palace for earth-The lotus lantern, no matter which monster or fairy, as long as the lotus lantern shines, it will be shocked and convinced. Sanshengmu eventually had a son named Chen Xiang. After seven years Erlang Sheng was able to locate the couple by light of the magical lotus lantern. He captured Chen Xiang so that Sanshengmu would return the lantern, and when she did she was imprisoned under a mountain. Chen Xiang learns of how his mother was imprisoned and plans to get the lantern back to look for his mother. Chen Xiang encounters many trials during his journey and in the time became a young man. He impressed the Monkey King so he made Chen Xiang magical axe. Chenxiang fought Erlang Shen with the axe and just as Erlang Shen was ready to kill Chenxiang, the lotus lantern’s light penetrated Chenxiang's body and merged with him so he was able to defeat Erlang Shen.

Chenxiang splits the mountain in half, Sanshengmu was rescued, and mother and son were reunited.

Adaptations

Films
Save Mother from Mountain (小英雄劈山救母), a 1928 Chinese film
Breaking Open the Mountain to Rescue Mother (劈山救母), a 1950 Hong Kong film
The Precious Lotus Lamp (寶蓮燈), a 1956 Hong Kong Cantonese opera film
The Precious Lotus Lamp, Part II (1957)
The Precious Lotus Lamp, Part III (1958)
The Magic Lotus Lantern (寶蓮燈), a 1959 Chinese film
Breaking Open the Mountain to Rescue Mother (劈山救母), a 1961 Taiwanese film
The Lotus Lamp (七彩寶蓮燈), a 1963 Hong Kong Cantonese opera film
The Magic Lamp (寶蓮燈), a 1964 Hong Kong Huangmei opera film
The Lotus Lamp (寶蓮燈), a 1965 Hong Kong film
The Magic Lotus Lantern (寶蓮燈), a 1976 Hebei bangzi film

Animation films
Saving Mother (西嶽奇童), a 1984 Chinese film
Lotus Lantern, a 1999 Chinese film
Chen Xiang (西嶽奇童), a 2006 Chinese film

TV series
The Lamp Lore (寶蓮燈), a 1986 Hong Kong TV series
The Polien Lantern (天地傳說之寶蓮燈), a 2001 Chinese-Taiwanese TV series
Lotus Lantern, a 2005 Chinese TV series
Prelude of Lotus Lantern (2009)

References

Chinese fairy tales